The Mercedes-Benz C11 is a Group C prototype race car introduced for the 1990 World Sports-Prototype Championship.  Built by Sauber as a successor to the Sauber C9, the C11 used the same Mercedes-Benz M119 5.0L twin turbo V8.  It was the first time that Mercedes-Benz chose to put their name on the car, instead of simply using Sauber.

Development

Following on the success of the Sauber C9, the Mercedes-Benz C11 was the last Group C prototype built by the Sauber Mercedes team before the introduction of the 3.5 litre category. Whereas, the C9 chassis had been constructed mostly from aluminium, the C11 was built from carbon fibre. The chassis was designed from scratch by Leo Ress, who had been with the team since the days of the Sauber C7, and the first example was built by local Swiss firm Nobrac ("carbon" spelt backwards). The remainder were built by DPS Composites in Surrey, UK whose principal, Dave Price, was also a team manager at Sauber. The new chassis was designed for more downforce with a lower frontal area. At 320 km/h (200 mph) it generated  of downforce, about  more than the C9 at the same speed. Unlike the Sauber C9, the new C11 did not have a low downforce/low drag configuration for Le Mans, that race not being a part of the championship season in 1990. The whole car was considerably slimmer in appearance than its older sibling and was both lighter and stiffer. Ballast was added to bring its minimum weight up to the required  with an extra 5 kilograms added for safety. Particular attention was paid to air entry and exit points around the wheel arches and the airflow through the cockpit was improved for driver comfort. The development program also included the use of a rolling road wind tunnel which was unique for Group C at the time.

A new Mercedes 5-speed transaxle was designed with the rear suspension in mind and the previous longitudinal spring/damper design of the C9 was abandoned in favour of a transverse layout, actuated by push rods. This allowed for a better integrated rear end that was much stiffer than before, according to designer Leo Ress. The front suspension remained similar to the older car with inboard transverse coil spring/damper units actuated by push rods. The brakes were Brembo and tyres were switched from Michelin to Goodyear.

The 5 litre, twin-turbo Mercedes-Benz M119 engine was retained from the older car and was sourced directly from the Mercedes engine facility at Untertürkheim. It was developed by Willi Muller and Gerd Witthalm and was returned to Stuttgart after every race, the transmission remaining at the Sauber facility at Hinwil. In high boost, it could go up to 2.4 Bar and make 850 hp at 7,000 RPM.

History

Sauber had planned to build four C11 chassis and have enough spares for a fifth if needed. They had also changed to Goodyear tyres because of the development potential for the new Mercedes-Benz C291 which was in virtual co-development. The first C11 had its initial test run at Paul Ricard in late 1989 but the car did not debut until the first round at Suzuka in April the following year.

Although debuting at the first round of the 1990 World Sports-Prototype Championship at Suzuka, the car did not actually race. The team had to revert to the older C9 on race day after Jean-Louis Schlesser crashed the new car in practice. However, the C11 finally made its much-anticipated debut at the second race at Monza in late April and its performance potential was immediately apparent. Mauro Baldi and Jochen Mass qualified 1–2, with Baldi almost two seconds clear of Mercedes' nearest competitors. They came home first and second. Throughout the rest of the season, the C11 won all but one race and easily took the team's championship for the year. The only black spot on an otherwise flawless performance was at Silverstone, when the leading car of Schlesser & Baldi suffered a rare engine failure. At that stage they had carved out a lead of about 50 seconds after 40 laps. The other team car of Mass and Schumacher had been disqualified for outside assistance during practice.

The only other blot on an otherwise exceptional season was the disqualification of the number 1 car in Mexico for exceeding its fuel allocation.

Although Sauber-Mercedes had triumphed at the 1989 24 Hours of Le Mans, the team choose not to defend the title in 1990 due to the race not being part of the 1990 World Sports-Prototype Championship schedule. The race reverted to being part of the championship season again in 1991.

According to Leo Ress, the C11 was easy to drive, partly because the centre of aerodynamic pressure did not shift under acceleration or braking. Mauro Baldi rated the car as one of the best he ever drove. Jaguar driver Martin Brundle recalled that the XJR-11 could just stay with the Mercedes if driven flat out but could not match it for downforce. Brundle also believed that the larger capacity engine with lighter turbocharging meant less lag and better fuel consumption, especially since the team also had good drivers. Team manager Dave Price, who had also constructed most of the chassis, felt that the Mercedes engine/turbo combination gave them much better fuel economy than anyone else, particularly while Schlesser was driving.

In all, five chassis were built, C11-03 being the most victorious chassis with four wins in the 1990 season.

Although the C11 was to be replaced by the Mercedes-Benz C291 for the 1991 World Sportscar Championship season, problems with the C291's new engine led Mercedes-Benz to continue to campaign the C11 alongside the C291. The C11 was able to gain three more class wins in the 1991 season before the C291 fully replaced it.

In classic racing the car also won Le Mans Legend twice, in 2012 and 2014.

The reason Sauber skipped from C9 to C11 is due to the difficulty of pronouncing "C10" in German.

Specifications

Year:	1990
Make:	Mercedes-Benz & Sauber
Model:	C11
Engine Location: Mid
Drive Type: Rear Wheel
Weight: 
Engine Configuration: V
Cylinders: 8
Aspiration/Induction: Twin-turbocharged
Displacement:  (5 l).
Horsepower:  at 7,000 rpm
Torque:  at 3,500 rpm
HP to Weight Ratio:  / lb
HP / Liter: 146.8 bhp / Liter
Gears: 5 speed
Transmission: Manual

Complete World Sportscar Championship results

 Points also scored by the Sauber C9.   Points also scored by the Mercedes-Benz C291.

See also

Mercedes-Benz in motorsport

References

External links
 Prototyp - Sauber C11
 www.ultimatecarpage.com - Sauber C11
 C#Sonstiges de.wikipedia.org - the German Wikipedia page

Group C cars
C11
Sauber Motorsport